Zadetkyi Island or Zadetkyi Kyun, also known as Saint Matthew's Island, is an island at the southern end of the Mergui Archipelago, Burma. Its northern side forms the southern shore of Hastings Harbor, where there is a base of the Myanmar Navy.

Geography

Nearby islands
The Alladin Islands, the largest of which is Than Kyun, are a scattered cluster of islands extending to the W and SSW of Zadetkyi Island.

References 

Mergui Archipelago
Tanintharyi Region